The Last Cuentista is a middle-grade dystopian novel by Donna Barba Higuera, published  October 12, 2021 by Levine Querido. The story follows Petra Peña who, along with her family and a few hundred others, leave Earth to continue the human race after a comet strikes the planet. After awaking on a new planet, Petra is the only one who remembers Earth and must use storytelling to keep her people's history alive.

In 2022, the book won the Newbery Medal and Pura Belpré Award. The cover was illustrated by Raxenne Maniquiz.

Reception 
The Last Cuentista generally received positive reviews, including starred reviews from Kirkus Reviews, Publishers Weekly, School Library Journal, and Shelf Awareness.

Kirkus called the book "[a]n exquisite tonic for storytellers far and wide, young and old." School Library Journal's Mara Alpert called it "[a] keep-you-up-all-night, compulsively readable science fiction novel that offers much food for thought." Writing for The Wall Street Journal, Megan Cox Gurden said it was "clever and compelling."

Previous Newbery winner Tae Keller said The Last Cuentista

 “certainly veers into the dark end of middle-grade fiction, with brainwashing, ‘purging’, and, yes, the destruction of our entire planet ... but it doesn’t dwell in the darkness, preferring to give its readers healthy doses of hope, wonder and page-turning action.”

The Last Cuentista was named one of the best children's books of the year by BookPage, The Boston Globe, the Chicago Public Library, Kirkus, the New York Public Library, Publishers Weekly, School Library Journal, TIME, and The Wall Street Journal.

References 

2021 children's books
2021 science fiction novels
American children's novels
Dystopian fiction
Newbery Medal–winning works